Ulba Metallurgical Plant, shortly UMP, also widely known as Ulba ("Úlbi metallýrgııalyq zaýyty" Aktsıonerlik Qoǵamy, "ÚMZ" AQ; Russian: АО "Ульбинский металлургический завод", АО "УМЗ") is joint stock company. It is part of National Atomic Company "Kazatomprom", which is National operator for nuclear industry in Kazakhstan. It is one of the world leaders in terms of production of beryllium, tantalum, and niobium, as well as uranium-based fuel bricks for nuclear power stations. It has been proposed as a site for storing and distributing low-enriched uranium fuel internationally, to reduce proliferation risk from installing enrichment facilities in IAEA-unfriendly states.

Ulba is located in Oskemen, large center of non-ferrous metallurgy of Kazakhstan.

TÜV-CERT certification body certifies Quality System of UMP JSC according to ISO-9001.
Ulba has a number of daughter and affiliates companies for service, auxiliary operations and sales promotion. Some of them are:
 Mashzavod Ltd., machinery plant
 Ulba Fluorine Complex Ltd., production of hydrofluoric acid for different applications
 Ulba SPC Ltd., research & production company
 Yingtan Ulba Shine Metal Materials Co., Ltd., production of copper beryllium products such as strip, sheets, plates etc. It is located in Yingtan, Jiangxi Province, China. This is Joint Venture between Ulba Metallurgical Plant and Ningbo Shengtai Electronic Materials Co., Ltd.
 BerylliUM Ltd., sales promotion of Ulba products in Russia and CIS countries, located in Moscow, Russia.
 Ulba China Co., Ltd., sales promotion of Ulba products in China and East Asia countries, located in Shanghai, China.

References

Further reading
 Soviet nuke plant sheds secrets, thinks business - timesofmalta.com

External links
 Official website
 http://www.kazatomprom.kz/
 https://web.archive.org/web/20120322193816/http://www.ulba-shine.com/en/
 http://www.beryllium.ru
 https://web.archive.org/web/20110411165544/http://www.ftor.kz/

Companies of Kazakhstan